Arcanum Unbounded: The Cosmere Collection is a collection of epic fantasy short stories and novellas written by American author Brandon Sanderson set in his Cosmere universe. It was published on November 22, 2016 by Tor Books.

Contents
The nine stories in the collection are set in the worlds of Roshar, Scadrial, Sel, Threnody, First of the Sun, and Taldain, which are all a part of Sanderson's Cosmere universe. The collection also includes essays and illustrations for the various planetary systems in which the stories are set. All have been released individually or as part of multi-author anthologies in the past.

The collection includes the following works:

The Emperor's Soul, a novella originally published in 2012
The Hope of Elantris, originally published as an e-book in 2007
The Eleventh Metal, originally released in 2011 as part of the Mistborn Adventure Game
Allomancer Jak and the Pits of Eltania, Episodes 28 through 30, originally released on August 3, 2014 as part of the Alloy of Law extension to the Mistborn Adventure Game
Mistborn: Secret History, a short novel originally published in 2016 as an e-book
White Sand, an excerpt of the graphic novel originally published in 2016 and a previously unpublished opening section of the original prose version of the story.
Shadows for Silence in the Forests of Hell, a novella originally published in 2013 in the Dangerous Women anthology
Sixth of the Dusk, a novellette originally published in 2014 in the Shadows Beneath anthology
Edgedancer, a Stormlight Archive novella

Reception
Publishers Weekly called the collection required reading for fans of Sanderson's work and noted that it also offers a lot to readers who are undaunted by learning a lot. Kirkus Reviews wrote that many of the stories were "good...with all the quick wit, richly detailed settings, and memorable characters fans have come to expect from this prolific writer." However, they also stated that some of the stories lacked solid character building and felt "more like deleted scenes".

References

External links
 

Works by Brandon Sanderson
Fantasy short story collections
2016 short story collections
Tor Books books